Robert Rodgers may refer to:
 Robert L. Rodgers (1875–1960), member of the U.S. House of Representatives from Pennsylvania
 Robert Rodgers (architect) (1895–1934), American architect
 R. H. Rodgers (born 1944), American classical scholar

See also
 Robert Rogers (disambiguation)